Alessandro Franzetti (born 16 May 1991) is an Italian paralympic rower who won a gold medal as cox at the 2008 Summer Paralympics (he was seventeen).

References

External links
 

1991 births
Living people
Paralympic rowers of Italy
Paralympic gold medalists for Italy
Medalists at the 2008 Summer Paralympics
Paralympic medalists in rowing
rowers at the 2008 Summer Paralympics